Calystegia spithamaea, which common names include: low false bindweed, low bindweed, erect bindweed, and upright bindweed, is a species of plant found in eastern North America.

Conservation status in the United States
It is listed as threatened in Maine and Vermont and endangered in Massachusetts and New Jersey. It is listed as a species of special concern in Connecticut, where it is believed to be extirpated.

References

spithamaea
Flora of North America